Iron tree may refer to:
 Olea europaea subsp. cuspidata, a subspecies of the olive tree
 Parrotia persica, a tree species found in Azerbaijan
 Prosopis africana, a tree species found in Africa
 The Iron Tree, the first book in the Crowthistle Chronicles, written by Cecilia Dart-Thornton
 The nickname of a tree discovered in 1896 in Three Tuns, Pennsylvania, United States

See also 
 Iron wood (disambiguation)
 Wooden iron, a polemical term often used in philosophical rhetoric to describe the impossibility of an opposing argument